Sir Alexander Percival Waterfield, KBE, CB (16 May 1888 – 2 June 1965), commonly known as Percival Waterfield, was an English civil servant. Educated at Christ Church, Oxford, he entered the civil service in 1911 and served as the Treasury Remembrancer for Ireland from 1920 to 1922; from 1939 to 1955, he was First Civil Service Commissioner. His son was the diplomat John Waterfield.

References 

1888 births
1965 deaths
English civil servants
Alumni of Christ Church, Oxford
Knights Commander of the Order of the British Empire
Knights Bachelor
Companions of the Order of the Bath